Henry Herbert Burton (27 March 1874 – 4 February 1964) was an English first-class cricketer active 1904–05 who played for Surrey and London County. He was born in Lambeth and died in Streatham.

Burton married Mary Elizabeth Ehrmann (21 January 1883 – 16 November 1957), daughter of German immigrants who were bakers. They had seven children, Henry (who served for the Royal British Army during WW2 and was a POW under the Japanese working on the Death Railway), Bernard, Kathelen, Gwyn, Son, Ronald, and Joan.

References

1874 births
1964 deaths
English cricketers
Surrey cricketers
London County cricketers
Gentlemen of England cricketers